The Howard Nemerov Sonnet Award was established in 1994 by The Formalist. The award, honoring the poet Howard Nemerov (1920–1991), was an open competition for sonnets in English that drew about 3000 entries annually.  The award was $1000, and from 1995–2004, the winning sonnet and the eleven finalists were published inFollowing the discontinuation of The Formalist in 2004, the winning sonnet and eleven finalist poems were published in the literary magazine Measure.  The creation of this award is associated with the "New Formalism" movement.

In the announcement of the 2017 winner and finalists, the 2017 competition was described as the "24th & final" contest.

List of winners
The winners, judges, and winning sonnets from 1994–2011 are posted on a webpage of The Formalist; the subsequent winners are also listed in the table below:

See also
American poetry
List of poetry awards
List of literary awards

References

American poetry awards